Egypt competed at the 1996 Summer Paralympics in Atlanta, United States.  They sent 31 athletes (26 males and 5 females), who won 30 total medals, 8 gold, 11 silver and 11 bronze.  They participated in several sports including powerlifting. The team included powerlifters Ahmed Gomaa Mohamed Ahmed and Metwalli Mathana.

Medallists

See also
Egypt at the Paralympics
Egypt at the 1996 Summer Olympics

References 

Nations at the 1996 Summer Paralympics
1996
Summer Paralympics